ν Virginis, Latinized as Nu Virginis, is a single star in the zodiac constellation of Virgo, located at the western tip of the classic constellation and nearly due south of the prominent star Denebola. It is a red-hued star with an apparent visual magnitude of 4.04 and can be seen with the naked eye. Because the star lies near the ecliptic it is subject to occultations by the Moon. Parallax measurements provide an estimated distance of around 294 light years from the Sun, and it is drifting further away with a radial velocity of +50 km/s.

This object is an M-type red giant, currently on the asymptotic giant branch, with a stellar classification of M1 III. It is an SRB-type semiregular variable star with its brightness varying by 0.0125 in magnitude. These variations have four periods lasting 11.1, 12.3, 16.8, and 23.7 days. This star has about 1.6 times the mass of the sun, but it has expanded to 54 times the Sun's radius and shines 631 times as brightly as the Sun. The effective temperature of its outer atmosphere is 4,009 K.

References

M-type giants
Asymptotic-giant-branch stars
Semiregular variable stars
Virgo (constellation)
Virginis, Nu
Durchmusterung objects
Virginis, 003
102212
057380
4517